Nadia Petrova was the defending champion, but did not qualify this year.
Simona Halep won the title, defeating Samantha Stosur in the final, 2–6, 6–2, 6–2.

Players

Alternates

Draw

Finals

Serdika group
Standings are determined by: 1. number of wins; 2. number of matches; 3. in two-players-ties, head-to-head records; 4. in three-players-ties, percentage of sets won, or of games won; 5. steering-committee decision.

Sredets group
Standings are determined by: 1. number of wins; 2. number of matches; 3. in two-players-ties, head-to-head records; 4. in three-players-ties, percentage of sets won, or of games won; 5. steering-committee decision.

References

External links
Official Draw

WTA Tournament of Champions
2013 WTA Tour
Tennis tournaments in Bulgaria
Sports competitions in Sofia
2013 in Bulgarian sport